Erica terminalis, the Corsican heath or upright heath, is a species of flowering plant in the family Ericaceae, native to southern Europe and northern Africa, and naturalised elsewhere. It is a bushy evergreen shrub, sometimes described as a tree heath (a term also applied to E. arborea and E. lusitanica).

References

terminalis